The men's tournament in volleyball at the 1964 Summer Olympics was the first edition of the event at the Summer Olympics, organized by the world's governing body, the FIVB in conjunction with the IOC. It was held in Yokohama and Tokyo, Japan from 13 to 23 October 1964.

Qualification

* Morocco withdrew and were replaced by Bulgaria.

Rosters

Venues

Round robin

|}

|}

Final standing

Medalists

References

External links
Final Standing (1964–2000)
Results at Todor66.com
Results at Sports123.com

Volleyball at the 1964 Summer Olympics
1964 in volleyball
Men's events at the 1964 Summer Olympics